Aungmye Thazi is a village in Sagaing District in the southeast of the Sagaing Division in Burma.  It is located northeast of Okhnebin.

External links
Maplandia World Gazetteer

Populated places in Sagaing District